Pidorus glaucopis is a moth of the family Zygaenidae. It is found in Nepal, northern India, Indochina, the Malay Peninsula, Korea and Japan.

External links

JPmoths

Chalcosiinae
Articles containing video clips
Moths described in 1773
Taxa named by Dru Drury